Rokas Guščinas (born 6 January 1991) is a Lithuanian artistic gymnast.

Achievements 
2008 European Junior Championships – 5th
2009 European Artistic Gymnastics Championships – 31st
2010 European Artistic Gymnastics Championships – 31st
2010 World Artistic Gymnastics Championships – 78th

References 

Lithuanian male artistic gymnasts
Living people
1991 births
Gymnasts at the 2012 Summer Olympics
Olympic gymnasts of Lithuania
Place of birth missing (living people)
Gymnasts at the 2015 European Games
European Games competitors for Lithuania